The Bold Ones: The Protectors (also known as The Protectors, Deadlock or The Law Enforcers) is an American crime drama series that aired on NBC from 1969 to 1970; it lasted for seven episodes (including one pilot movie).

The Protectors was part of The Bold Ones, a rotating series of dramas that also included The New Doctors (with E.G. Marshall), The Lawyers (with Burl Ives) and The Senator (with Hal Holbrook).  This was the shortest of the four series.

Overview
The series stars Leslie Nielsen as Deputy Chief Sam Danforth, the deputy chief of police in a volatile California city. He is a conservative law and order type who is brought in from Cleveland to try to keep the lid on. Nielsen often has run-ins with the city's idealistic, liberal black DA, William Washburn played by Hari Rhodes.

Cast
 Leslie Nielsen as Deputy Police Chief Sam Danforth the deputy chief of police in a volatile California city
 Hari Rhodes as the city's idealistic, liberal black District Attorney William Washburn, who often has run-ins with Sam Danforth.

Guest stars

 Aldo Ray made one appearance as Edward Logan in the pilot movie: "Deadlock"
 Max Julien made one appearance as Coley Walker in the pilot movie: "Deadlock"
 Edmond O'Brien made one appearance as Warden Millbank in: "If I Should Wake Before I Die"
 James Broderick made one appearance as Father Hayes in: "A Thing Not of God"
 Frank Maxwell made two appearances as Mayor Alesi in: "The Carrier" and "A Case of Good Whiskey at Christmas Time"
 Michael Bell made two appearances as Sergeant Jack Miller in: "Draw a Straight Man" and "A Case of Good Whiskey at Christmas Time"

Episodes

Home media
On September 15, 2015, Timeless Media Group released The Bold Ones: The Protectors- The Complete Series on DVD in Region 1.

References

External links
The Bold Ones: The Protectors at TVIV
 
 

1969 American television series debuts
1970 American television series endings
1960s American crime drama television series
1970s American crime drama television series
English-language television shows
NBC original programming
Television series by Universal Television
American detective television series
Television series about prosecutors